Twenty ships of the Royal Navy have borne the name HMS Swan, or the archaic HMS Swann, probably after the bird, the Swan:

  was a balinger acquired 1417 and sold 1423.
  was a vessel sailing with Sir Francis Drake in 1572.
  was a flyboat sailing with Drake in 1577. She was lost in 1578.
  was a 'frigat' listed in service between 1632 and 1633.
  was a ship launched in 1641 and wrecked in 1653.
  was a 22-gun ship captured in 1652 and sold in 1654.
  was a 6-gun flyboat captured from the Dutch in 1665 and sold in 1666.
  was a smack launched in 1666 and captured by the Dutch in 1673.
  was a 2-gun fireship purchased in 1667 and expended that year.
  was a 32-gun fifth rate captured from the Dutch in 1673. She was converted into a 10-gun fireship between 1688 and 1689 and was wrecked in the 1692 Jamaica earthquake.
  was a sixth rate captured from the Algerians in 1684 and sold that year.
  was a 24-gun sixth rate launched in 1694. She foundered in 1707.
  was a 12-gun sixth rate launched in 1709 and sold in 1713.
  was a 14-gun sloop launched in 1745 and sold in 1763.
  was a 14-gun sloop launched in 1767. She bore the name HMS Explosion between 1779 and 1783 whilst being used as a fireship. She was sold in 1814. Between 1815 and 1840 she made 23 annual voyages as a whaler in the Northern Whale Fishery. She also made one voyage as a whaler in the Southern Whale Fishery.
 HMS Swan (1782) was an 18-gun sloop, previously purchased from civilian service in 1781 and named . She was renamed HMS Swan in 1782, but capsized later that year.
  was a 10-gun cutter purchased in 1788 for the Revenue Service, assigned to Royal Naval service in 1790 and wrecked in 1792. What happened in 1788 was that the contract system for Revenue cutters was abolished and the Collector of Customs Cowes was relieved of personal financial responsibility for upkeep of the vessel (Swan II), this responsibility was assumed by the Board of Customs.
  was a 10-gun cutter purchased in 1792 for the Revenue Service, assigned for Royal Naval service in 1795 and captured that year by the French. The vessel (Swan III) was not transferred out of the Revenue Service; when captured it was on temporary secondment to the Admiralty and running despatches during the Quiberon landings. In October 1810,  captured the French privateer cutter Indomptable, of 16 guns and 130 men, and sent her into Plymouth. The privateer was described as the former revenue cutter Swan, of Cowes. The Indomptable was more likely to be the Swan V (built 1798, captured in 1807) rather than Swan III.
  was a 10-gun Nimble-class cutter launched in 1811 at Cowes. She had an unexceptional wartime career. After the war she served in fishery protection, and half of her entire career as a floating chapel for seamen. She was broken up in 1874.
  was an  wooden screw gunboat launched in 1856, used as a coal hulk from 1869 and sold in 1906.

See also
 His Majesty's

Citations and references

 

Royal Navy ship names